Pueblo Viejo is one of the 212 municipalities of the Mexican state of Veracruz. 
It is located in the state's Huasteca Alta region. 
The municipal seat is the city of Ciudad Cuauhtémoc, Veracruz.

Geography
It borders with the state of Tamaulipas and the municipality of Pánuco to the north and west, with the Gulf of Mexico to the east, and with Tampico Alto to the south.

Demographics
In the 2005 INEGI Census, the municipality reported a total population of 52,593 (up from 48,054 in 1995), 
of whom 8,950 lived in the municipal seat. 
Of the municipality's inhabitants, 553  (1.2%) spoke an indigenous language, primarily Nahuatl; 0.32% of the total population spoke no Spanish.

Settlements
The municipal seat of Pueblo Viejo is not its largest centre of population.
Of the municipality's 73 settlements, the largest are:
Benito Juárez (2005 population: 14,015)
Anáhuac (13,657)
Cd. Cuauhtémoc (municipal seat; 8,950)
Hidalgo (6,159)
Primero de Mayo (Los Mangos) (5,068)

References

External links
Pueblo Viejo on Veracruz State Govt. web page

Municipalities of Veracruz